Kaliyaganj College is a college in Kaliyaganj in the Uttar Dinajpur district of West Bengal, India. The college is affiliated to University of Gour Banga, offering undergraduate courses.

Departments

Science
Chemistry 
Physics 
Mathematics
Computer Science

Arts and Commerce
Bengal  
English
Sanskrit
Hindi
History
Geography
Political Science
Economics
Philosophy
Commerce

Accreditation
The college is also recognized by the University Grants Commission (UGC).
The college was accredited by National Assessment and Accreditation Council at B level on 31 March 2007.
Kaliyaganj college has been reaccredited by NAAC at B++ Level in December 2016. Scoring 2.78, it has become the highest score achiever college under University of Gour Banga.

See also

References

External links 
Kaliyaganj College
University of Gour Banga
University Grants Commission
National Assessment and Accreditation Council

Colleges affiliated to University of Gour Banga
Academic institutions formerly affiliated with the University of North Bengal
Educational institutions established in 1968
Universities and colleges in Uttar Dinajpur district
1968 establishments in West Bengal